{{DISPLAYTITLE:C5H10N2O3}}
The molecular formula C5H10N2O3 (molar mass: 146.14 g/mol) may refer to:

 Glutamine
 Isoglutamine, or α-glutamine 
 β-Ureidoisobutyric acid